Agios Thomas (Saint Thomas / Άγιος Θωμάς ) is an island in the Saronic Gulf, located north of the gulf and northwest of Aegina, part of the Saronic Islands. It belongs to the municipality of Aegina.

The island can be reached by ferry from Athens in 45 minutes and from Corinth in 20 minutes. 
In 2015, it was bought by Warren Buffett and Alessandro Proto for 15 million euros.

References

Aegina
Saronic Islands